ICAF may refer to:
 Industrial College of the Armed Forces, a U.S. military educational institution 
 International Capoeira Angola Foundation, a capoeira angola group located in Brazil.
 International Child Art Foundation, an international organization on children arts.
 International Committee on Aeronautical Fatigue and Structural Integrity, a professional association that was formed in 1951.
 Italian Co-Belligerent Air Force, was the air force of the Royalist "Badoglio government" in southern Italy during the last years of World War II.
 The International Commission on the Anthropology of Food and Nutrition, a commission of the International Union of Anthropological and Ethnological Sciences (IUAES).